Hartmut Möllring (born 31 December 1951, Groß Ilsede) is a German politician of the Christian Democratic Union of Germany (CDU). From 1990 to 2013 he was a member of the Landtag of Lower Saxony. From 2003 to 2013, he was the Minister of Finance for the Lower Saxony. He was also chairman of the TdL and a memberof the Supervisory Board of Salzgitter AG

References

1951 births
Ministers of the Lower Saxony State Government
20th-century German politicians
German prosecutors
Christian Democratic Union of Germany politicians
21st-century German politicians
20th-century German judges
People from Hildesheim
Members of the Landtag of Lower Saxony
Living people
People from Peine (district)